The second season of Pretty Little Liars, based on the books of the same name by Sara Shepard, premiered on June 14, 2011, and concluded on March 19, 2012, on ABC Family. On January 10, 2011, ABC Family renewed the series for a second season. The season premiere brought in 3.68 million viewers, which was higher than the season 1 premiere. The Halloween special aired on October 19, 2011, drawing 2.5 million total viewers. The second half of season 2 premiered on January 2, 2012.

Overview
Picking up the night Ian Thomas's body disappears, Spencer, Aria, Hanna, and Emily are painted as liars by the news and police. The girls' parents request they see a therapist, Dr. Anne Sullivan. They initially refuse, and after a tense therapy session, their parents ask that the girls end their friendships with one another. This creates much tension, as the girls are forced to meet in secret. Spencer reveals that Ian may still be alive, suspecting Melissa to be hiding him somewhere. With the help of Melissa's ex-fiancé Wren, the girls follow them out to an old silo, where Ian's body is discovered, along with a suicide note. Emily later realizes that the note is composed of various messages from "A" and that "A" planted the note to make them think Ian had murdered Alison. Armed with this revelation, the girls begin investigating other potential suspects, such as Alison's older brother Jason, who has moved back to town, as well as Jenna Marshall. They later cut ties with Garrett Reynolds after learning of his romantic relationship with Jenna, who Ali had accidentally blinded in a prank gone wrong. 

The girls confess to Dr. Sullivan that they are being tortured by "A", allowing Dr. Sullivan to piece together the blackmailer's identity. However, before Dr. Sullivan can inform the girls of who "A" is, she disappears. "A" forces the girls to do various tasks throughout Hanna's father's wedding day, such as forcing Aria to blackmail Ezra's former fiancé with a plagiarized college paper and sabotaging Hanna's father's wedding. Spencer is also forced to end her relationship with Toby Cavanaugh to keep him safe from "A's" wrath. 

Emily is lured out to an old barn, where she is trapped by "A" who attempts to kill her using carbon monoxide poisoning. However, someone rescues her, and Emily has a vision of Alison. The girls arrive and "A" instructs them to dig up Dr. Sullivan before she runs out of oxygen. However, "A" has framed them, and they are subsequently arrested with the shovel Alison had been murdered with. Spencer's mother is able to get them out of jail and they are forced to endure community service. 

Aria also reveals her relationship with Ezra to her parents before "A" can, which ends negatively. Aria's father makes numerous threats towards him, before causing him to lose his job at Hollis College. Although they break up briefly, Aria and Ezra begin seeing each other in secret with the help of her childhood friend, Holden Strauss. Unbeknownst to his overprotective parents, Holden participates in regular fighting competitions, despite having a severe heart condition. 

The girls later attempt to trick "A" by making them think they have something that could give away their identity; Emily is confronted by "A" in an abandoned plant nursery. When Emily reveals the girls had tricked them, "A" physically attacks her, but Aria and Spencer arrive and corner them. They throw a vase into the air, shattering the glass ceiling and allowing them enough time to escape; however, Hanna arrives and hits "A" with her car, knocking them down momentarily. The girls chase them into the woods, but lose them. When they examine Hanna's car, they discover "A's" phone on the ground, which had apparently fallen out of their pocket when Hanna hit them with her car. The girls enlist Caleb's help in unlocking the phone, as Hanna and Caleb had gotten back together during the later half of the season. 

Eventually, Alison is linked to an old doll hospital in town nearby called Brookhaven, and later a rural motel, The Lost Woods Resort. The girls attend a masquerade party, where they plan to confront "A" who appears to be a woman dressed as The Black Swan from Swan Lake. Spencer, accompanied by Mona, rides out to Lost Woods, while the other girls chase "A". Spencer and Mona are able to steal the key to one of the rooms, which is revealed to be "A's" Lair. Mona then reveals to Spencer that she is "A", while the woman at the costume party was only a decoy. Mona knocks Spencer unconscious, driving her to a nearby cliff. She gives Spencer the option of joining her "A" Team, or dying. 

Spencer momentarily escapes, and the other girls learn of Mona's plan and rush to her aid. Spencer and Mona struggle, and Mona is knocked into a ravine, but survives. Emily learns that Maya was murdered, after she had seemingly disappeared. Mona is hospitalized in Radley Sanitarium, where she is visited by a blonde woman in a red trench coat, revealing Mona was working for someone else the whole time.

Cast

Main cast 
 Troian Bellisario as Spencer Hastings
 Ashley Benson as Hanna Marin
 Holly Marie Combs as Ella Montgomery
 Lucy Hale as Aria Montgomery
 Ian Harding as Ezra Fitz
 Bianca Lawson as Maya St. Germain
 Laura Leighton as Ashley Marin
 Chad Lowe as Byron Montgomery
 Shay Mitchell as Emily Fields
 Sasha Pieterse as Alison DiLaurentis

Recurring cast
 Tyler Blackburn as Caleb Rivers
 Janel Parrish as Mona Vanderwaal
 Keegan Allen as Toby Cavanaugh
 Yani Gellman as Garrett Reynolds
 Tammin Sursok as Jenna Marshall
 Drew Van Acker as Jason DiLaurentis
 Torrey DeVitto as Melissa Hastings
 Brendan Robinson as Lucas Gottesman
 Cody Allen Christian as Mike Montgomery
 Nolan North as Peter Hastings
 Roark Critchlow as Tom Marin
 Brant Daugherty as Noel Kahn
 Nia Peeples as Pam Fields
 Julian Morris as Wren Kingston
 Lesley Fera as Veronica Hastings
 Annabeth Gish as Anne Sullivan
 Shane Coffey as Holden Strauss
 Bryce Johnson as Darren Wilden
 Paloma Guzmán as Jackie Molina
 Natalie Hall as Kate Randall

Guest cast
 Ryan Merriman as Ian Thomas
 Claire Holt as Samara Cook
 Heather Mazur as Isabel Randall Marin
 Jim Titus as Officer Barry Maple
 Eric Steinberg as Wayne Fields
 Lindsey Shaw as Paige McCullers
 Lachlan Buchanan as Duncan Albert
 Amanda Schull as Meredith Sorenson
 Andrea Parker as Jessica DiLaurentis
 Betty Buckley as Regina Marin
 Tilky Jones as Logan Reed
 Anthony Tyler Quinn as Ron
 Giant Drag as Themselves 

Notes
  Cast member Bianca Lawson is credited as a series regular from episode 11 until episode 20. Unlike the other series regulars, Lawson is only credited in the episodes she appears in.

Episodes

Development and production
After an initial order of 24 episodes, it was announced in June that a special Halloween-themed flashback episode would air as part of ABC Family's 13 Nights of Halloween lineup, bringing the season 2 episode order to 25 episodes.

On December 13, 2011, it was announced that the identity of A would be revealed in the Spring Finale. Filming of season two wrapped on December 16, 2011.

Casting
Janel Parrish, Tammin Sursok, Bianca Lawson, and Tyler Blackburn return in the second season as Mona Vanderwaal, Jenna Marshall, Maya St. Germain, and Caleb Rivers. Also returning are Yani Gellman, Torrey DeVitto, Lindsey Shaw, Claire Holt, Keegan Allen, Brant Daugherty, Brendan Robinson, and Julian Morris, who will all reprise their roles from the first season. Annabeth Gish appears as Anne Sullivan, a therapist whom the girls' parents feel can help them on their problems. Andrea Parker will play Jessica DiLaurentis, Alison's mother, who returns to Rosewood to help out with a fashion show being held in Alison's honour. Actor Drew Van Acker also joined the cast playing Jason DiLaurentis, replacing Parker Bagley.

Ratings

Live + SD ratings

DVD release

References

2011 American television seasons
2012 American television seasons
Pretty Little Liars (franchise)